Fresnay-le-Long is a commune in the Seine-Maritime department in the Normandy region in northern France.

Geography

Population

Places of interest
 The twelfth century church of St.Nicolas.
 The chapel de la Passion-du-Sauveur, dating from the sixteenth century.

See also
Communes of the Seine-Maritime department

References

Communes of Seine-Maritime